is a Japanese footballer currently playing as a midfielder for Verspah Oita.

Club career
Watanabe made his professional debut in a 0–3 Emperor's Cup loss against Thespakusatsu Gunma.

Career statistics

Club
.

Notes

References

External links

1997 births
Living people
People from Nagoya
Association football people from Aichi Prefecture
Tokai Gakuen University alumni
Japanese footballers
Association football midfielders
Nagoya Grampus players
Mito HollyHock players